Gumlapur (also Gumlapoor or Gummulapuram) is a village in the Korutla Mandal Karimnagar district of the Indian state of Telangana, in the Deccan Plateau in the north part of Telangana.

Villages in Karimnagar district